Leknes is the administrative centre of the municipality of Leka in Trøndelag county, Norway.  The village is located on the northeastern part of the island of Leka in the northwestern part of Trøndelag county.  The local church, Leka Church, sits on the south side of the village.  There is also a shop and an elementary school.

References

Leka, Norway
Villages in Trøndelag